Lucius of Cyrene was, according to the Acts of the Apostles, one of the founders of the Christian Church in Antioch, then part of Roman Syria. He is mentioned by name as a member of the church there, following the account King Herod's Death:

The account in Acts 13 states that the group of prophets and teachers prayed and fasted, and were inspired to commission Barnabas and Saul to undertake missionary journeys further afield.

Lucius is indicated as a founder of the Antiochene church by inference from an earlier passage:

He is considered to have been the first bishop of Cyrene.

There is also a Lucius mentioned in Romans 16:21. There is no way of knowing for sure whether this is the same person, but Origen identifies the Lucius in Romans with the evangelist Luke (Comm. Rom. 10.39)

Notes

References

 Walsh, Michael A New Dictionary of Saints: East and West London: Burns & Oats 2007

External links
 Lucius of Cyrene at Catholic Online
 saints.sqpn

1st-century bishops in Roman Anatolia
Christian saints from the New Testament
Libyan saints
People in Acts of the Apostles
People in the Pauline epistles
Prophets of the New Testament
Saints of Roman Cyrenaica
Seventy disciples